The Mid-Ontario Junior B Hockey League was a Junior "B" ice hockey league based in Southern Ontario from 1970 to 1978.  They were sanctioned by the Ontario Hockey Association and Canadian Amateur Hockey Association, and competed for the All-Ontario Junior "B" title, the Sutherland Cup.

History
The league was formed in 1970, bringing aboard several Suburban Junior C Hockey League teams such as the Orillia Terriers, the Newmarket Redmen and the Bolton Bruins, the Midland Flyers and Streetsville Derbys, and the Burlington Mohawks from the Niagara District Hockey League.  Additional Junior C teams such as the Oakville Blades, Hespeler Shamrocks and Milton Flyers joined in 1970. Other members were the Barrie Colts and the Oak Ridges Dynes.

In 1971, the Junior B leagues re-aligned themselves geographically, as the Collingwood Blues and Owen Sound Greys joined the Mid-Ontario junior B league, and the Oakville Blades, Milton Flyers, Burlington Mohawks, Hespeler Shamrocks and Streetsville Derbys moving to the Central Junior B.

The Owen Sound Greys made the jump to the Southern Ontario Junior A Hockey League in 1975 after 3 straight Mid-Ontario titles.  In 1976, they were followed into the Southern Ontario A by the Collingwood Blues.

In 1978, a weakened Mid-Ontario league folded and the Orillia Terriers, Thornhill Thunderbirds, the Barrie Colts, and Oak Ridges Dynes joined the Central League.

Teams

Playoff champions

Regular season champions

References

External links
OHA Website

Defunct ice hockey leagues in Ontario